Bagdad is a novel by Ian Dennis published in 1986.

Plot summary
Bagdad is a novel in which the setting is an Arabian land.

Reception
Dave Langford reviewed Bagdad for White Dwarf #82, and stated that "an outrageously mannered performance, full of exotic dottiness. The hierarchs of Bagdad seem well grounded in existential Angst and, when not fleeing the improbably bloodbaths of the revolutionary Ripe Fruit party, tell each other twisted little tales-within-tales like "The Jinni and the Civil Servant"."

Reviews
Review by Mark Greener (1986) in Vector 135

References

1986 novels